Guangdong Province Department of Education is a department of the provincial government of Guangdong, China. Its headquarters is in Yuexiu District, Guangzhou.

References

External links
 Guangdong Province Department of Education 
 
 
 English overview of education in the province

Education in Guangdong